The Mutla Ridge is located in Jahra Governorate. It is the most prominent elevation in Kuwait, standing at 466 feet (142 metres) high, while it is not the highest point in the country.

History
 
During the  Gulf War, the Iraq forces were going to launch bombs while they were on the ridge to threaten Saudi Arabia. In February 1991, American aircraft attacked retreating Iraqi forces fleeing Kuwait in the direction of Basra on the "Highway of Death."

Coalition forces later used the rocky outcropping for communication towers, to communicate with troops in Iraq.

During operation "Desert Spring" in 2003, a detachment of the Oklahoma National Guard 45th division 1/179 infantry B company followed by the Indiana National Guard watched and defended the outpost until late in the war, when they were moved to Tallil Air Base in Iraq. Also watching over the Ridge in 2003, was the 946th Transportation Co., a reserve unit, out of Lewes, DE.

Landforms of Kuwait
Gulf War
Ridges of Asia
Highest points of countries
History of Kuwait